Xyroschoenus is a genus of flowering plants belonging to the family Cyperaceae.

Its native range is Seychelles.

Species:
 Xyroschoenus hornei (C.B.Clarke) Larridon

References

Cyperaceae
Cyperaceae genera